Ciclova may refer to several places in Caraș-Severin County, Romania:

Ciclova Română, a commune
 Ciclova Montană, a village in Oravița town
 Ciclova (river), a tributary of the Caraș